Angelo Sierre Blackson (born November 14, 1992) is an American football defensive tackle of the National Football League (NFL). He played college football at Auburn and was drafted by the Tennessee Titans in the fourth round of the 2015 NFL Draft.

College career
Blackson attended and played college football at Auburn University from 2011–2014.

Professional career

Tennessee Titans
The Tennessee Titans selected Blackson in the fourth round (100th overall) of the 2015 NFL Draft.

On May 14, 2015, the Tennessee Titans signed Blackson to a four-year, $2.85 million contract with a signing bonus of $571,615.

On September 2, 2017, Blackson was waived by the Titans. He finished his tenure with the Titans with 24 tackles and 2.5 sacks.

New England Patriots
On September 4, 2017, Blackson signed with the New England Patriots' practice squad.

Houston Texans
On November 1, 2017, the Houston Texans signed Blackson off the Patriots' practice squad.

On March 11, 2019, Blackson signed a three-year, $12 million contract extension with the Texans. In Week 15 of the 2019 season, Blackson blocked a field goal in a 24-21 win over the Titans, earning AFC Special Teams Player of the Week.

On September 5, 2020, Blackson was released by the Texans.

Arizona Cardinals
On September 8, 2020, Blackson was signed by the Arizona Cardinals.

Chicago Bears
On March 20, 2021, Blackson signed a two-year contract with the Chicago Bears.

References

External links
Arizona Cardinals bio
Auburn Tigers bio

1992 births
Living people
American football defensive ends
American football defensive tackles
Arizona Cardinals players
Auburn Tigers football players
Chicago Bears players
Houston Texans players
New England Patriots players
People from Bear, Delaware
Players of American football from Delaware
Sportspeople from the Delaware Valley
Tennessee Titans players